The 2018 season is Chonburi Football Club's 13th existence in the new era since they separated from Chonburi–Sannibat Samutprakan Football Club in 2006. It is the 3rd season in the Thai League and the club's 13th consecutive season in the top flight of the Thai football league system since separated in the 2006 season.

League by seasons

Competitions

Thai League

Thai FA Cup

Thai League Cup

References

External links
 Thai League official website
 Club's official website
 Club's official Facebook page
 Club's info from Thai League official website

Chonburi F.C. seasons
Association football in Thailand lists
CBR